Chirodipterus paddyensis is an extinct species of lungfish which lived during the Devonian period. Fossils have been found in Europe and Australia.

See also

Chirodipterus australis

References

External links
 Chirodipterus at The Digital Morphology library

Prehistoric lungfish
Devonian bony fish
Prehistoric fish of Australia
Devonian fish of Europe